Jacey may refer to:

Given name  

 Jacey Eckhart, American military life consultant 
 Jacey Harper (1980-) male sprint athlete
 Jacey Jetton (1983-) American politician and business owner
 Jacey Murphy (1989-) female Canadian rugby union player
 Jacey Sallés, British actress

Family name 

 Alyssa Jacey (1981-), American singer-songwriter, dancer and choreographer

Other 

 The Jacey Cinemas chain founded by Joseph Cohen